Liz LaManche (born Elizabeth Manicatide, 1967) is an American artist based in Somerville, Massachusetts, known for creating large scale, public installations and street art in the Boston and Washington, DC, areas.

Education

LaManche received a B.A. in Architecture at Yale University studying graphic design under Inge Druckrey, and did a thesis project in architectural ornament/site specific urban installations advised by sculptor Kent Bloomer.

Career

LaManche spent most of her professional career in software user interface design, web development and graphic design, always painting in her spare time. In 2005, LaManche began experimenting with large-scale murals at Burning Man, illuminated with programmed color-changing LED lighting, which later became known as "art for kinetic light." These were some of the first experiments in this genre of LED art as architectural LED lighting was first becoming available to makers and artists. These murals appeared for several years at the Burning Man festival in Black Rock City, NV, and at the Boston and New York Decompression events.

Work

LaManche is noted for large-scale murals and installations in the Boston and Washington D.C. areas.  Her work is often characterized by bright color and playful figures or a layered use of symbolic & iconographic detail. Her stated goal is to use universals of human experience to humanize the urban environment, and create a more inclusive, progressive vision of human society. "I'd like to provide ways for people to engage with each other and break down barriers," says La Manche, "contributing to greater understanding, peace and justice in our society. Literally, I believe we need this to be sustainable as a species."

"After Dark, Hyattsville"

In 2011 LaManche was commissioned to create a 40x14-foot mural for kinetic light on the Franklin's Brewery building, facing Route 1 in Hyattsville, Maryland, part of the designated Arts District. This was the first permanent outdoor mural for kinetic light. The piece features colorful characters and dreamlike imagery alluding to aspects of the neighborhood, including the local college's mascot and a humorous reference to another piece of public art in a nearby park. Programmed light shows projected on the piece via architectural lighting are designed to make the colors in the painting appear to swap and move.

"Connected By Sea"

"Connected by Sea" or the "Dock Tattoo Project", also dubbed "The 1000-foot tattoo" is located in a sculpture park in a working shipyard in East Boston that is part of the Boston Harborwalk. A series of 19 large tattoo-themed designs, stained into the cement surface of a 1000-foot long pier, forms a walking path to its end and a view of Boston Harbor. The designs give homage to the different cultures that Boston had contact with during its clipper-ship trade era and its growth as a city. It is an attempt to tell a more inclusive and multicultural story of Boston history. It was ranked as one of the "50 best pieces of Boston public art" by WBUR's ARTery in 2016

"Stairs of Fabulousness"

This 2014 installation in the Boston City Hall building by was the product of a New Urbanism design competition run by Mayor Walsh's Office of New Urban Mechanics, aimed at improving public spaces in Boston with temporary, low-budget installations designed to "surprise and delight." One of the 9 winners of this Public Space Invitational, the "Stairs of Fabulousness" placed 1,200 linear feet of safety non-skid tape on the large central brick staircase in the City Hall main atrium. The tape, in an array of fluorescent colors, created a large rainbow gradient over the whole height of the staircase, which served "to essentially transform the concrete milieu into something colorful and inviting."

"Stairs of Fabulousness" was popular both for its whimsical name and as a statement about the brutalist architecture of City Hall itself, long a subject of public debate. "The art installation brought shades of color to the Boston City Hall stairs, and anyone who can successfully spice up the facade of Government Center through creativity is on fire in our books." wrote Hilary Milnes of BostInno. "I found the atrium staircase dark and treacherous, it needed safety tape, and that comes in colors! ...Why not be fabulous?" wrote LaManche.

"Salem's Connected World"

A sister project to "Connected By Sea", this temporary installation made up a walking path that covered three city blocks of the Downtown Salem District in Salem, Massachusetts. It consisted of painted tattoo-themed symbols and designs from the different cultures specifically connected to Salem's maritime history. Installed in the spring of 2015, it was the first project funded by the new Salem Public Art Commission. Some of the designs are still visible along the cement walk of Artists Row.

"Lowell: Water and Work"

A commissioned piece for the City of Lowell, Massachusetts, the entire installation included a 16-foot mural, and 2 blocks of sidewalk and other wall art along a new pedestrian walkway, and "rain art" using hydrophobic coating on the pavement to make art that appears when it rains. The entire project, called the Decatur WAY Green Alley, created a pedestrian walkway from a disused back alley in a program to use green technology to deal with storm water runoff. The mural depicts the Lowell mills and canals with a portrait of a young Harriet Hanson Robinson, a mill worker who became a labor leader and suffragette.

Smaller public art and street art 
 Wraparound building exterior in Bartlett Yard, Boston.
 Cambridge Brewing Company mural, 2014. 
 "The Goddess of Winter Hill", Somerville, MA 2014: 8x10-foot panels on the rear of Somerville post office. Client: City of Somerville.
 "Safety Dance" crosswalk, 2016: 96-foot long crosswalk depicting pedestrian safety figures dancing.
 "The Tattoo Heart", a Boston street piano, 2016.
 "The Soul's Journey As A Series of Weird Old Cars" Somerville, MA 2016.

See also
Firefly Arts Collective

Writing

"Connected By Sea" The Artists Working: Theory and Practice, Vol. 1 No. 1, pp. 59–72. May 2016

Sources
 Art in Public Places, Boston Globe Big Picture (November 7, 2014)
 Connected By Sea, Documentary video by Patrick Torphy, News Director of WERS, October 2014 
 Artist's Dock Tattoo Connects Boston To Its History As An International Trade Port. Amy Gorel, WBUR ARTery. (October 14, 2016)
https://soundcloud.com/889-wers/sets/you-are-here-performance-art Performance Art: Exclusive Interview with Artist Liz LaManche. You Are Here, WERS 88.9fm (November 23, 2014)
 Salem's Connected World, The Salem (MA) News. Video by Cheryl Richardson (May 20, 2015)
 Artistry Documentary entry in Now You See Me Festival by Laura Sweet (November 29, 2014)
 ‘A Series of Weird Old Cars’ honors community work by late Al Riskalla by Manna Parker, The Somerville Times (November 30, 2016)
 Art For All by Eliza Rosenberry, SCOUT Somerville, The Arts Issue, (February 28, 2017)
  ‘Stairs of Fabulousness’ At City Hall Are Pretty Fabulous by Megan Turchi, Boston.com (September 17, 2014)

References

External links 

American women installation artists
American installation artists
Street artists
1967 births
Living people
Artists from Massachusetts
Artists from New Jersey
People from Hackensack, New Jersey
Yale University alumni
21st-century American women artists
21st-century American artists